The following is a list of planet types by their mass, orbit, physical and chemical composition, or by another classification.

The IAU defines that a planet in the Solar System must orbit around the Sun, has enough mass to assume hydrostatic equilibrium, and has "cleared its neighborhood". There is currently no accepted definition for exoplanets.

Under the IAU definition, true or "major planets" can be distinguished from other planetary-mass objects (PMOs), such as dwarf planets and sub-brown dwarfs. Nonetheless, certain planet types have been applied to other planetary-mass objects; the Pluto–Charon system has been referred to as "double dwarf planets", for instance.

By mass regime

By orbital regime

By composition

Other types

See also 
 
 Minor planet
 
 Stellar classification
 Substellar object
 Sudarsky's gas giant classification

Notes

References

External links 
 Periodic Table of Exoplanets at Planetary Habitability Laboratory, University of Puerto Rico at Arecibo
 A Thermal Planetary Habitability Classification for Exoplanets
 A Mass Classification for both Solar and Extrasolar Planets
 What Kinds of Planets Are Out There? at NASA
 Stern and Levison, "Regarding the criteria for planethood and proposed planetary classification schemes," Highlights of Astronomy 12 (2002)
 Lineweaver, C. H. and Robles, J. A. (2006). Towards a Classification System of Terrestrial Planets
 Out There: A Strange Zoo of Other Worlds
 SpaceEngine Planet Classifications
 A Planetary Classification Proposal

Planets